Michael Jerome Reece-Page (born 7 April 1987) is a British kickboxer, boxer, and  mixed martial artist. He is recognised in the MMA community for his unorthodox fighting style, which originated from freestyle kickboxing (points fighting) and sport karate. As of May 17, 2022, he is #2 in the Bellator Welterweight Rankings.

Early life
Page was born in St Mary's Hospital, London to Curtis Page Sr. and Pauline Reece, who were both Lau Gar kung fu practitioners. His father, a British Telecom employee, hailed from Trinidad while his mother, a nurse, was from Jamaica. Page is a maternal nephew of Lau Gar Master Stan Brown, who was also the instructor of his father. He has nine siblings, three of whom are adopted. Page attended Quintin Kynaston School in St John's Wood, alongside Olympian judoka Ashley McKenzie. He grew up in NW8 near Edgware Road and Lisson Green before moving to W10 near Queen's Park in 2003. Since almost everyone in his family was involved in martial arts, he felt it was natural to follow suit.

Kickboxing career
His father, Curtis Page Sr. was his instructor. Of his nine siblings, his sister Sefena and brothers Curtis Jr., Jamie, and Kalon are also kickboxing champions.

Page began training in Lau Gar at the age of 3 and competed at his first kickboxing tournament at the age of 5. By the age of 8, he began to devote himself to competition and entered his first international tournament in Germany.

Page won 10 world championships in kickboxing – his first was at the US Open ISKA World Martial Arts Championships 1998 in Orlando, Florida when he was 12 years old – and was crowned British champion over 25 times. By the age of 13, Page started entering adult competitions. To prepare, he would train five hours a day for five days a week. During tournament days he would often fight up to 14 times due to competing in three weight classes, and at one point fought 22 times in a day across five weight classes. Another world title win was at the W.A.K.O. World Championships 2007 (Coimbra) where, at the −89 kg semi-contact division, he won gold after defeating Dave Heffernan. He also competed at the W.A.K.O. Austrian Classics Worldcup 2008 (Kufstein), winning gold in the −84 kg semi-contact division over Krisztián Jároszkievicz. Page participated at the W.A.K.O. Irish Open 2008 (Dublin), earning silver in the −84 kg semi-contact division after falling short to Raymond Daniels. Page then won gold at the W.A.K.O. Austrian Classics Worldcup 2009 (Walchsee), placing first in both the −84 kg light-contact and semi-contact divisions, defeating Bojan Miskovic and Zvonimir Gribl respectively. Page returned to participate in the W.A.K.O. Irish Open 2009 (Dublin) but was defeated by Raymond Daniels, placing second in the −84 kg semi-contact division. Page – appointed as the WKA Head Coach – led a team to the WKA World Championships 2009 (Huelva), defeating James Benjamin Stewart to claim gold in the organisation's first semi-contact prize competition and bronze in the −90 kg light-contact division, upon being bested by Tarek Haydar. He then participated in the W.A.K.O. World Championships 2009 (Lignano Sabbiadoro) and finished second in the −84 kg semi-contact division, after being defeated by Krisztián Jároszkievicz. On 4 September 2010, he competed at the World Combat Games 2010 (Beijing) in the −84 kg semi-contact division, where he earned silver, losing gold to Krisztián Jároszkievicz. Page fought Raymond Daniels at the W.A.K.O. Irish Open 2011 (Dublin), securing silver in the −84 kg semi-contact division.

Page was scouted by the Great Britain Taekwondo team to train and qualify for the Olympics but turned it down to pursue a professional combat sports career.

When not competing Page trains others in kickboxing, primarily as an instructor at the Hands Down Martial Arts Academies throughout Surrey.

Mixed martial arts career

Background
Dissatisfied with the lack of exposure as well as the politics involved in competing among various kickboxing associations, Page decided to cross over into mixed martial arts. He initially considered going to American Top Team during his transition into MMA since his older siblings live in Miami but chose to start his career with London Shootfighters in July 2011, training with the likes of John Hathaway, Cláudio da Silva, Karlos Vemola, Alex Reid, Marcin Held, Jim Wallhead, and Marc Diakiese. Page also sparred with Alexander Gustafsson, James DeGale, Che Mills, Chris Eubank, Jr., Frank Muñoz, Dereck Chisora, Muhammed Lawal, Andrew Tate, Darren Stewart, Karl Amoussou, Johnny Walker, Filip Verlinden, Harut Grigorian, Gegard Mousasi, Neil Magny, and Artur Kyshenko. He entertained the possibility of fighting at lightweight. Page spends up to seven hours training in the gym, and does not undergo IV therapy after cutting weight. He cross-trains Brazilian jiu-jitsu at Gracie Barra. Page is represented by Paradigm Sports Management.

UCMMA
Page made his MMA debut at UCMMA 26 against Ben Dishman on 4 February 2012 and won via technical knockout from a first round tornado kick. His original opponent Sam Boo withdrew a day before the fight. The fight went viral and comparisons were drawn between Page and Anderson Silva. He was paid £200 for the bout.

On 7 April 2012, Page faced Miguel Bernard at UCMMA 27 in a 176 lb catchweight bout despite weighing in at 165 lb. Page won in the first round after forcing Bernard to tap out upon transitioning from a triangle choke into an armbar.

Page briefly returned to kickboxing when he fought in a UK-1 bout on 18 August 2012 at UCMMA 29. Page was supposed to challenge UCMMA UK-1 welterweight champion Peter Irving for the belt. However, Irving pulled out of the fight due to a neck injury and was replaced by Jefferson George after another three opponents dropped out within a month for undisclosed reasons. Page won after knocking out George from a two punch combination in the second round.

Super Fight League
On 24 June 2012, Super Fight League announced that they signed Michael Page to an exclusive 18-month, four-fight contract.

Page made his promotional debut on 2 November 2012 at SFL 7 as the main event against Haitham El-Sayed, winning by technical knockout in round one via doctor stoppage due to cuts.

Page returned to Super Fight League on 12 April 2013 to face Ramdan Mohamed at SFL 15 as the main event and won via rear-naked choke in the first round.

Bellator MMA

2013
After winning his UK-1 fight against Jefferson George, Page announced that he had signed a five-fight contract with Bellator MMA and that he would fight for Bellator and Super Fight League under their respective contracts.

Page was expected to make his promotional debut at Bellator 82 but pulled out of the bout citing surgery for an old injury. Another potential yet unannounced debut at Bellator 90 against Sean Powers was cancelled for undisclosed reasons.

Page made his debut on 21 March 2013 at Bellator 93. He faced Ryan Sanders and won via knockout at 10 seconds into the first round.

Page was scheduled to fight Kenny Ento at Bellator 102 but withdrew due to a rib cartilage injury, an ankle injury, and a knee injury. A later appearance slated for Bellator 109 against Andrew Osborne was also cancelled because of lingering injuries.

2014
Page was slated to fight Fight Master: Bellator MMA contestant Marcus Aurelio at Bellator 120 on 17 May 2014 but Aurelio withdrew due to injury. Ricky Rainey was immediately sought as a replacement after his Bellator 116 victory and was informed of his opponent a week later. Page won via technical knockout in the first round.

Page next faced Nah-Shon Burrell at Bellator 128 as the co-main event on 10 October 2014. He won via unanimous decision.

On 19 December 2014, Michael Page confirmed that he was no longer contracted with Super Fight League and instead signed an exclusive two year, five-fight contract extension with Bellator.

2015
Page was expected to face Curtis Millender at Bellator 134. However, Page pulled out of the fight due to a cut over his left eye which was sustained during a guard passing drill and required six stitches. He was replaced by Brennan Ward.

Page faced Rudy Bears at Bellator 140 on 17 July 2015. He won by knockout in the first round.

Page fought Charlie Ontiveros at Bellator 144 on 23 October 2015 with less than three weeks' notice after four opponents – including his initial opponent Marius Žaromskis and later Cristiano Souza – pulled out of the fight for undisclosed reasons. Page won via verbal submission due to elbows in the first round after dislocating Ontiveros' jaw.

2016
He was expected to fight Fernando Gonzalez at Bellator 151 as the co-main event but withdrew from the bout as he was already committed to officiate at the W.A.K.O. Irish Open 2016 (Dublin) as coach of the Top Ten UK team. He was replaced by Gilbert Smith.

Page defeated Jeremie Holloway at Bellator 153 on 22 April 2016, submitting him with an Estima lock in round one.

Page's fight with Fernando Gonzalez was rescheduled for Bellator 158 on 16 July 2016 but visa issues forced Gonzalez to withdraw. Page accepted a contract to fight Paul Daley after Josh Koscheck withdrew but Daley chose to fight Douglas Lima instead. Page fought Evangelista Santos and won by knocking out Santos with a flying knee in the second round. Santos underwent surgery afterwards due to a depressed frontal sinus fracture. The fight went viral partly due to the Pokémon Go-inspired post-fight celebration.

In July 2016, Bellator claimed that Page re-signed with the promotion and had four fights left on his contract. However, Page stated that he did not re-sign but had two fights left from existing contractual provisions.

Page fought Fernando Gonzalez on 19 November 2016 at Bellator 165 as the co-main event. He won the fight via split decision.

2017
A proposed bout between Page and Paul Daley was targeted for Bellator 179 but negotiations fell through after Daley chose to fight Rory MacDonald instead. Page was supposed to fight Derek Anderson but an old knee injury and neck injury forced him off the card. Daley attempted to brawl with Page after losing his fight. Another fight with Daley was proposed for September 2017 in London but was turned down by Daley, who instead opted to fight Lorenz Larkin at Bellator 183.

Page was expected to compete at Bellator 191 but a fight was never announced.

2018
Bellator attempted to match Page against Daley on 9 March 2018 but negotiations stalled when Daley refused to commit to the date.

Page fought David Rickels on 25 May 2018 at Bellator 200 as the co-main event. He won the fight via verbal submission due to a punch in the second round that opened a cut above Rickels' left eye. He spent a portion of his training camp at Straight Blast Gym - Ireland in preparation for the fight. He paid tribute to his cousin Helena Ramsay, a victim of the Stoneman Douglas High School shooting, during the open workout and post-fight interview.

On 30 July 2018, Page confirmed signing a new six-fight contract with Bellator, three for the tournament and three as part of the champion clause. The contract will let him box, subject to Bellator's approval.

2019
Page faced Paul Daley in the quarter-final of the Bellator Welterweight World Grand Prix Tournament on 16 February 2019 at Bellator 216. He won by unanimous decision, in an uneventful fight in which neither fighter was able to mount any significant offence. His father died prior to the fight on 26 December 2018.

Page fought former two-time Bellator Welterweight World Champion Douglas Lima in the semi-final of the welterweight tournament on 11 May 2019 at Bellator 221. Despite having some initial success, Page lost the fight via knockout in the second round.

Page faced Richard Kiely at Bellator 227 as the co-main event on 27 September 2019. He won the fight via knockout from a flying knee in the first round.

Page was expected to headline Bellator London 2 against Derek Anderson on 23 November 2019 but Anderson withdrew for undisclosed reasons on 12 November 2019. Page instead fought Giovanni Melillo and won by knockout in the first round.

On 29 December 2019, Page fought Shinsho Anzai at Bellator & Rizin: Japan in a 173 lb catchweight bout. He won by knockout in the second round.

2020
Page faced Ross Houston at Bellator 248 on 10 October 2020. He won the bout via unanimous decision.

2021
Page faced Derek Anderson at Bellator 258 on 7 May 2021. Page was supposed to fight Anderson twice before at Bellator 179 and Bellator London 2. During the first round, Page broke and flattened Anderson's nose with a kick, leading to the doctor stopping the fight between rounds.

Page faced Douglas Lima in a rematch on 1 October 2021 at Bellator 267, Bellator's first card in the UK since the COVID-19 pandemic. He won the bout via split decision.

2022 
Page was scheduled to fight for the Bellator Welterweight World Championship against reigning champion Yaroslav Amosov on May 13, 2022 at Bellator 281. However, Amosov pulled out of the bout to fight in the Russo-Ukrainian War and was replaced by Logan Storley with the bout instead being for the interim Bellator Welterweight World Championship. Page lost the bout via split decision.

2023 
Page faced Goiti Yamauchi on March 10, 2023 at Bellator 292. He won the bout 26 seconds into the bout after a leg kick ruptured Goiti's patella tendon.

Boxing career
On 12 July 2017, it was announced that Page signed a three-year, fifteen-fight contract with Hayemaker Ringstar, a promotional joint venture of David Haye and Richard Schaefer. Page began training under the tutelage of Ismael Salas at Hayemaker HQ on 27 July 2017, alongside Joe Joyce, Qais Ashfaq, and Willy Hutchinson. While he still trains at London Shootfighters, he spends four days a week training at Hayemaker HQ. Page compared the transition from MMA to boxing to a "sprinter turning into a long distance runner." He did commentary for Floyd Mayweather Jr. vs. Conor McGregor in Las Vegas with Mike Costello and Steve Bunce on BBC Radio 5 Live.

Page made his boxing debut on 20 October 2017 at Hayemaker Ringstar Fight Night against Jonathan Castano as the co-main event. He won via technical knockout in the third round. He was supposed to debut on the undercard of Haye vs. Bellew but was still negotiating with Bellator at the time.

Page wanted to fight at Hayemaker Ringstar Fight Night 2 on 16 February 2018 but Bellator wanted an MMA fight scheduled before allowing him to commit to another boxing fight.

He was expected to fight on the undercard of Haye vs. Bellew II but Bellator prevented him from competing due to its proximity to Bellator 200.

Page fought at Hayemaker Ringstar Fight Night 3 against Michal Ciach on 15 June 2018. He won by knockout in the second round.

Bare-knuckle boxing
In June 2022, it was announced that Page would make his bare-knuckle boxing debut for Bare Knuckle Fighting Championship. He fought Ultimate Fighting Championship veteran Mike Perry on August 20, 2022 in the main event at Bare Knuckle Fighting Championship 27: London. Page lost by majority decision after the sixth round after the bout was declared a split draw decision following the first five rounds.

Fighting style
Page describes his discipline as a "hands down kickboxing style" created from a "mishmash" of taekwondo, karate, and kung fu styles competing under a points scoring ruleset. As a low-volume movement-based fighter his game plan revolves around controlling distance and landing heavy counterstrikes with high accuracy. He relies on his elusive movement and knockout power to finish opponents and often engages in histrionics while fighting to maintain focus, unnerve his opponents, and rile up the crowd. Page credited Curtis Page Sr., Pauline Reece, Simon Lewis, and Marvin Francis as being the most influential in his combat sports career.

Personal life
Page received the moniker "Venom" from fellow kickboxer Marvin Francis in homage of the film Five Deadly Venoms.

He became a Pollo-pescetarian in August 2017.

Championships and accomplishments

Kickboxing
 World Combat Games
 2010 World Combat Games Silver Medalist (Semi-Contact)
 World Association of Kickboxing Organizations
 2011 W.A.K.O. Irish Open Silver Medalist (Semi-Contact)
 2009 W.A.K.O. World Championships Silver Medalist (Semi-Contact)
 2009 W.A.K.O. Irish Open Silver Medalist (Semi-Contact)
 2009 W.A.K.O. Austrian Classics Worldcup Gold Medalist (Light Contact)
 2009 W.A.K.O. Austrian Classics Worldcup Gold Medalist (Semi-Contact)
 2008 W.A.K.O. Irish Open Silver Medalist (Semi-Contact)
 2008 W.A.K.O. Austrian Classics Worldcup Gold Medalist (Semi-Contact)
 2007 W.A.K.O. World Championships Gold Medalist (Semi-Contact)
 World Kickboxing Association
 2009 WKA World Championships Bronze Medalist (Light Contact)
 2009 WKA World Championships Gold Medalist (Semi-Contact)
 International Sport Karate Association
 1998 US Open ISKA World Martial Arts Championships Gold Medalist (Semi-Contact)

Mixed martial arts
Bellator MMA
Bellator Welterweight Grand Prix Semifinalist
 Tied (with Douglas Lima) for most stoppage victories in Bellator Welterweight division history (nine)
 Tied (with Douglas Lima) for most knockout victories in Bellator Welterweight division history (eight)
Most knockout victories in Bellator history (ten)
World MMA Awards
2016 Knockout of the Year vs. Evangelista Santos at Bellator 158
MMAjunkie
2016 July Knockout of the Month vs. Evangelista Santos
2016 Knockout of the Year vs. Evangelista Santos
Sherdog
Sherdog's Top 10: Greatest Single Strikes in MMA History (No. 4) vs. Evangelista Santos
Sherdog's Top 10: Bellator MMA Knockouts (No. 2) vs. Evangelista Santos
2016 Knockout of the Year vs. Evangelista Santos
theScore
MMA's most devastating knockouts of 2016 (No. 1) vs. Evangelista Santos
Bleacher Report
2016 Knockout of the Year vs. Evangelista Santos

Mixed martial arts record

|-
|Win
|align=center|21–2
|Goiti Yamauchi
|TKO (leg kick)
|Bellator 292
|
|align=center|1
|align=center|0:26
|San Jose, California, United States
|
|-
|Loss
|align=center|20–2
|Logan Storley
|Decision (split)
|Bellator 281
|
| align=center|5
| align=center|5:00
|London, England
|
|-
|Win
|align=center|20–1
|Douglas Lima 
|Decision (split)
|Bellator 267
|
|align=center|3
|align=center|5:00
|London, England
|
|-
|Win
|align=center| 19–1
|Derek Anderson
|TKO (doctor stoppage)
|Bellator 258
|
|align=center|1
|align=center|5:00
|Uncasville, Connecticut, United States
|
|-
|Win
|align=center|18–1
|Ross Houston
|Decision (unanimous)
|Bellator 248
|
|align=center|3
|align=center|5:00
|Paris, France
|
|-
|Win
|align=center|17–1
|Shinsho Anzai
|KO (punch)
|Bellator & Rizin: Japan
|
|align=center|2
|align=center|0:23
|Saitama, Japan
|
|-
|Win
|align=center|16–1
|Giovanni Melillo 
|KO (punch)
|Bellator London 2
|
|align=center|1
|align=center|1:47
|London, England
|
|-
|Win
|align=center|15–1
|Richard Kiely
|KO (flying knee)
|Bellator 227
|
|align=center|1
|align=center|2:42
|Dublin, Ireland
|
|-
|Loss
|align=center|14–1
|Douglas Lima
|KO (punches)
|Bellator 221
|
|align=center|2
|align=center|0:35
|Rosemont, Illinois, United States
|
|-
|Win
|align=center|14–0
|Paul Daley
|Decision (unanimous)
|Bellator 216
|
|align=center|5
|align=center|5:00
|Uncasville, Connecticut, United States
|
|-
|Win
|align=center|13–0
|David Rickels
|TKO (retirement)
|Bellator 200
|
|align=center|2
|align=center|0:43
|London, United Kingdom
|
|-
|Win
|align=center|12–0
|Fernando Gonzalez
|Decision (split)
|Bellator 165
|
|align=center|3
|align=center|5:00
|San Jose, California, United States
|
|-
|Win
|align=center|11–0
|Evangelista Santos
|KO (flying knee)
|Bellator 158
|
|align=center|2
|align=center|4:31
|London, United Kingdom
|
|-
|Win
|align=center|10–0
|Jeremie Holloway
|Submission (achilles lock)
|Bellator 153	 
|	 
|align=center|1
|align=center|2:15
|Uncasville, Connecticut, United States
|
|-
|Win
|align=center|9–0
|Charlie Ontiveros
|TKO (elbows)
|Bellator 144
|
|align=center|1
|align=center|3:20
|Uncasville, Connecticut, United States
|
|-
|Win
|align=center|8–0
|Rudy Bears
|KO (punch)
|Bellator 140
|
|align=center|1
|align=center|1:05
|Uncasville, Connecticut, United States
|
|-
|Win
|align=center|7–0
|Nah-Shon Burrell
|Decision (unanimous)
|Bellator 128
|
|align=center|3
|align=center|5:00
|Thackerville, Oklahoma, United States
|
|-
|Win
|align=center|6–0
|Ricky Rainey
|TKO (punch)
|Bellator 120
|
|align=center|1
|align=center|4:29
|Southaven, Mississippi, United States
|
|-
|Win
|align=center|5–0
|Ramdan Mohamed
|Submission (rear-naked choke)
|Super Fight League 15
|
|align=center|1
|align=center|3:48
|Mumbai, India
|
|-
|Win
|align=center|4–0
|Ryan Sanders
|KO (punch)
|Bellator 93
|
|align=center|1
|align=center|0:10
|Lewiston, Maine, United States
|
|-
|Win
|align=center|3–0
|Haitham El-Sayed
|TKO (doctor stoppage)
|Super Fight League 7
|
|align=center|1
|align=center|2:15
|Mumbai, India
|
|-
|Win
|align=center|2–0
|Miguel Bernard
|Submission (armbar)
|UCMMA 27
|
|align=center|1
|align=center|1:43
|London, United Kingdom
|
|-
|Win
|align=center|1–0
|Ben Dishman
|TKO (tornado kick)
|UCMMA 26: The Real Deal
|
|align=center|1
|align=center|1:05
|London, United Kingdom
|

Professional boxing record

Bare knuckle record

|-
|Loss
|align=center|0–1
|Mike Perry
|Decision (majority)
|BKFC 27: London
|
|align=center|6
|align=center|2:00
|London, England
|
|-

Kickboxing record

|-
|-  bgcolor="#CCFFCC"
| 2012-08-18 || Win ||align=left| Jefferson George || UCMMA 29 || London, United Kingdom || KO (punch) || 2 || 2:04 || 1–0
|-
! style=background:white colspan=9 |
|-
| colspan=9 | Legend:

See also
 List of current Bellator fighters

References

External links
Official website
Official Bellator profile

1987 births
Living people
English sportspeople of Trinidad and Tobago descent
English sportspeople of Jamaican descent
People from Paddington
People from Ewell
People from Hackney Central
People educated at Quintin Kynaston School
Black British sportsmen
Sportspeople from London
Boxers from Greater London
British wushu practitioners
English practitioners of Brazilian jiu-jitsu
English male kickboxers
English male karateka
English male mixed martial artists
Welterweight mixed martial artists
Mixed martial artists utilizing karate
Mixed martial artists utilizing Lau Gar
Mixed martial artists utilizing kickboxing
Mixed martial artists utilizing boxing
Mixed martial artists utilizing Brazilian jiu-jitsu
English male boxers
Light-heavyweight boxers
Bellator male fighters
Mixed martial artists utilizing taekwondo